Mount McKelvie is a mountain on Vancouver Island, British Columbia, Canada,  northeast of Tahsis and  northwest of Mount Bate.

See also
 List of mountains in Canada

References

Vancouver Island Ranges
One-thousanders of British Columbia
Nootka Land District